William Simons (1810 - 1878) was a Reconstruction era politician in South Carolina. He was a member of the 48th and 49th South Carolina General Assembly from 1868 until 1872 and was one of the four representatives for Richland County. He was a Republican. 

He is buried at Randolph Cemetery with eight other reconstruction era legislators.

His name is sometimes listed as William H. Simons and was possibly William M. Simons but in his time of legislative service listed as William Simons.

He had a wife Eliza and three children Catherine, Emma, and Rosena.

See also
 African-American officeholders during and following the Reconstruction era

References

1810 births
1878 deaths
African-American history of South Carolina
19th-century American politicians
African-American politicians during the Reconstruction Era